The Meinders School of Business is the business school of Oklahoma City University, a private university in Oklahoma City, Oklahoma. It offers courses for undergraduate, graduate, professional development, and continuing education students and undergraduate and graduate degrees in most business majors of study.  The Meinders School of Business achieved initial accreditation from Association to Advance Collegiate Schools of Business International in 2014.  The Meinders School of Business' Energy Programs were the first graduate programs accredited by the American Association of Professional Landmen in 2013.

Undergraduate programs
Bachelor of Business Administration (B.B.A.) in:

 Accounting
 Business Administration
 Economics
 Finance
 Marketing

Graduate Degrees

 Master of Business Administration (M.B.A)
 Master of Science in Accounting (M.S.A.)

Energy Programs
Meinders School of Business offers graduate programs in Energy Management and Energy Legal Studies
The programs are the only graduate programs accredited by the AAPL.

The Master’s of Science in Energy Management and the Master’s of Science in Energy Legal Studies degrees were created to provide  rigorous, graduate-level education for those who seek to serve in positions of leadership within the energy industry.  Whether an individual is in a career in finance, accounting, geology, engineering, land, government relations, communications or any other component of the  energy industry, these degrees provide an education that will further enhance an energy professional’s future success.

Both programs are taught in cohorts that follow the sequence of courses, and they both begin together in a cohort taking an Overview of the Energy Industry taught by our Dean and a second course in the legal and ethical environment of the energy industry before they divide into their specific tracks.

Energy Legal Studies  Energy professionals understand the collaborative nature of success in the industry amongst all the disciplines and how each discipline regularly encounters the legal environment of accounting, acquisitions & divestitures, surface and sub-surface property rights, regulatory compliance, infrastructure, and much  more.  Energy Legal Studies focuses on the legal principles that underlie the entire life-cycle and scope of any element one may follow through the industry and all that it touches along the way:  contract law, property law, environmental law, administrative/regulatory law, corporate entity, and oil and gas law.  Along with acquiring this significant, substantive knowledge, the Energy Legal Studies track enhances students’ abilities to write, speak, and think critically, and to engage in successful negotiations in their careers in energy.

Energy Management concentrates on the core business elements of the energy industry.  Energy professionals seeking to advance their careers within a company or those seeking to start their own private venture often find their previous education did not provide them with the necessary knowledge of management, accounting, finance, economics, communications, and operations.  The Energy Management track provides a challenging, energy-centered curriculum within these functional concepts, with an emphasis on energy, and the opportunity to collaboratively utilize them in the capstone experience.

Facilities

Herman Meinders, a university trustee and longtime benefactor of the university, provided OCU $18 million to build a new home for its business school. Completed in 2003, the 80,000-square-foot building serves as a learning and technology hub for the school.

In addition to classroom and office space, the three-story facility includes a 2,500-square-foot auditorium capable of hosting business conferences, a computer lab, a student/faculty lounge to facilitate collaboration and mentoring, and breakout rooms for small-group meetings. Business students have access to an on-site learning center where they can videotape then review mock interviews and presentations, as well as a career center where they will be able to take online self-assessment tests and get career planning help. State-of-the-art technology, including wireless Internet access and video conferencing facilities, will bring together students from around the world in "virtual" classroom environments.

The Executive MBA program was previously offered in Kuala Lumpur; Thailand; Singapore and Tianjin, China. In Tianjin, the MBA program was conducted in collaboration with the Tianjin University of Finance and Economics (TUFE).

Institutes and Centers

 Economic Research and Policy Institute which provides economic impact reports, and policy analysis, for the state and organizations such as the Cherokee Nation.
 Loves Entrepreneurship Center which assists students and entrepreneurs with creating and starting their own companies, helping write a business plan as well as seek funding.
Meinders School of Business is committed to engagement, innovation, and impact.  To wit, it regularly hosts events and conferences including its annual energy conference and most recently a conference focused on development of natural gas in Tanzania.

References

External links

Oklahoma City University

Oklahoma City University
Business schools in Oklahoma
Educational institutions established in 1907
1907 establishments in Oklahoma